Alexander John Currie (December 12, 1891 – October 4, 1951), was head coach of the original Ottawa Senators for the 1925–26 NHL season. As a player for the Senators, he won the Stanley Cup in the 1910–11 NHA season.

Playing career
Born in Ottawa, Currie graduated to senior hockey with the Ottawa Primrose of the Ottawa City Hockey League in 1907, joining the Ottawa Emmetts in 1908 where he played on a forward line with Punch Broadbent and Gordon Roberts. He was loaned to the Quebec Bulldogs for one game that season. The following season, he did not play hockey.

Currie returned to the NHA in 1913 with the Montreal Wanderers for one season, and played one final season with Senators in 1914–15.

Coaching career
Starting in 1914, Currie became coach of various teams in the Ottawa area, such as the Ottawa Aberdeens and Ottawa St. Pats. He coached in the National Hockey League (NHL) for the Ottawa Senators in the 1925–26 season.

Personal life
Currie's parents were Mr. and Mrs. Francis Currie of Ottawa. He had a brother John W., and a sister, Mabel.

Currie was found drowned in the Ottawa River on October 18, 1951 after he had been missing for two weeks. Currie's body was recovered from the Ottawa River near Angers, Quebec, about  down the river from Hull. Currie had been gravely ill for some months prior to his disappearance, and he was last seen alive after he dismissed a taxi cab on Booth Street in Ottawa on the afternoon of October 4.

Outside of ice hockey Currie was also a well-known lacrosse player, and as a golf player he was a member of the Rivermead Golf Club. He had worked as a  siderographer for the Canadian Bank Note Company for some years.

He is buried at Beechwood Cemetery in Ottawa.

Statistics

Statistics from sihrhockey.org

NHL coaching record

References

External links
Alex Currie at JustSportsStats

1891 births
1951 deaths
Canadian ice hockey coaches
Canadian ice hockey right wingers
Haileybury Comets players
Ice hockey people from Ottawa
Montreal Wanderers (NHA) players
Ottawa Senators (NHA) players
Ottawa Senators (original) players
Quebec Bulldogs (NHA) players
Stanley Cup champions